The canton of Moÿ-de-l'Aisne is a former administrative division in northern France. It was disbanded following the French canton reorganisation which came into effect in March 2015. It consisted of 17 communes, which joined the canton of Ribemont in 2015. It had 7,898 inhabitants (2012).

The canton comprised the following communes:

Alaincourt
Benay
Berthenicourt
Brissay-Choigny
Brissy-Hamégicourt
Cerizy
Châtillon-sur-Oise
Essigny-le-Grand
Gibercourt
Hinacourt
Itancourt
Ly-Fontaine
Mézières-sur-Oise
Moÿ-de-l'Aisne
Remigny
Urvillers
Vendeuil

Demographics

See also
Cantons of the Aisne department

References

Former cantons of Aisne
2015 disestablishments in France
States and territories disestablished in 2015